Korey Coleman (born September 9, 1971) is an American film critic, animator, filmmaker, voice actor, and comedian. He is best known for his now defunct film review site, Spill.com and its current spiritual successor Double Toasted.

Biography
Born to Willie and Irma Coleman and the youngest of three, Korey Coleman grew up loving animation and eventually got into University of Texas hoping to major in film making, but eventually dropped out. While there, however, he met fellow artist and future co-host, Martin Thomas who took an interest in his comic strip Eddie the Albino Squirrel. One of his classmates was future Chowder creator C. H. Greenblatt who worked under him as an assistant. Coleman also attended school with Russell Neal of the R&B group Hi-Five.

Coleman was also an assistant animator during the production and making of Space Jam. Warner Bros. needed help finishing the project so they hired a team of animators which included Korey. "When they hired us to do effects animation for the movie I wasn't allowed anywhere near the project. One day, though, the team was so behind they pulled me on to do one shadow of Tweety Bird, who in that particular scene is hooked up to an iron lung. I guessed they figured 'it's simple enough that even he can't screw that up'. It probably took ten minutes to do, but I still received a place in the closing credits, right up there with people who had spent weeks working on the film." Coleman reiterated his credit as an "assistant animator"; admitting he was not necessarily assisting, more so he supplied additional work. He also denounced IMDb's claim that he worked on Quest for Camelot humorously stating, "I've never been to Camelot".

Coleman started a cable access series called The Reel Deal. The show reunited him with Martin and also brought on fellow reviewers Chris Cox, C. Robert Cargill and Tony Guerrero. During this time, Coleman had directed and starred in a movie called 2 A.M. as a way of expanding his film making capabilities. Coleman grew bored of doing an access show and figured the next step would be to expand on a wider level. Taking the preexisting audio from their reviews, Coleman animated over them for comical effect. Cox had posted the videos online where they were seen by Hollywood.com. After meeting the heads of the site, Coleman formed Spill.com. The site ran from 2007 to 2013 with Saving Mr. Banks being their final review. Cox left to start OneofUs.net, Cargill continued his career as a screenwriter and Tony retired from podcasting to become an actor, appearing in Alita: Battle Angel as a henchman (although he does return for a few special occasions). The character of Co-Host 3000 is owned by Hollywood.com.

Coleman decided to start a Kickstarter in launching a new site. The initial goal was $30,000, but by the end they earned $133,860. From there, DoubleToasted was created.

Personal life
Coleman is not religious, but he grew up in a religious household. He recalled waiting until he was 18 years old to finally tell his mother he wasn't going to church anymore, in which his mother quietly and disappointedly responded with "ok". His father was very strict on him and would often make him work at the family owned auto shop, sometimes making him do tasks that he didn't know how to do. He said once his father told him to go change a tire for a customer and he returned telling his dad he doesn't know how to change a tire.

Before becoming a film critic, Coleman was a member of the National Guard of the United States. He claims once in a discussion that his unit was about to be sent off to Iraq, but right before it happened the US pulled out. His father fought in World War II, the Korean War and the Vietnam War, in the process getting wounded in one of the conflicts.

In August 2016, Coleman proposed to his girlfriend, Merve Mia. Their wedding was on July 7, 2017.

Coleman is friends with The Fast and the Furious star Tyrese Gibson, whom he is prone to make fun of on his show. He briefly shared a mailbox with author Anna Todd whose novel After was adapted into a movie of the same name, which he reviewed on his show.

On December 28, 2021, Coleman revealed that he and his wife had contracted COVID-19, but cautioned that they only had mild symptoms. He revealed that he already had taken his shots and booster; having had a history of Asthma. Coleman was able to carry his show as usual, though his co-hosts skyped safely from home while making light of the situation. A couple of days later, Coleman revealed that he and his wife had fully recovered from COVID.

Filmography

Production
Space Jam (1996) — assistant animator
2 A.M. (2006) — director, producer, writer, editor
Fresh Baked Video Games (2006) — animator
Porn Editor (2008) — animator
Zoovie (2017) — key animator

Actor
Courage Under Fire (1996) — Radio Operator, uncredited
2 A.M. (2006) — Les
Grow Up, Tony Phillips (2013) — Mr. Meyers
Howard Joins the Club (2014) — Korey
Lazer Team (2015) — Web Bomb! Host
Another Cinema Snob Movie (2019) — Theater Commentator 1
The Stockholms (2020) — Cop 1 (voice)

References

External links
 
 

Living people
American film critics
People from Waco, Texas
Animators from Texas
American atheists
YouTubers from Texas
American podcasters
American animated film producers
1971 births